This article is a list of diseases of cucurbits (Citrullus spp., Cucumis spp., Cucurbita spp., and others).

Bacterial diseases

Fungal diseases

Miscellaneous diseases and disorders

Nematodes, parasitic

References
 Common Names of Diseases, The American Phytopathological Society
 Cucurbit Diagnostic Key, The Cornell Plant Pathology Vegetable Disease Web Page
 Cucurbit Diseases (Fact Sheets and Information Bulletins), The Cornell Plant Pathology Vegetable Disease Web Page
 Lucid Key to Diagnosing Postharvest Diseases of Cantaloupe

Cucurbit